Blacklight is the third studio album by Christian rap artist, Tedashii on Reach Records. It was released on iTunes on May 24, 2011, and in stores on May 31, 2011. The album produced singles "Need It Daily" (which later became a music video) and "Riot". The song "Last Goodbye" was made into a music video which was released on May 30, the day after Memorial Day.

Theme 
The release ends with the statement: "We can and should live with the end in mind."

Track listing

Charts 
When it debuted on May 31, 2011, Blacklight reached No. 1 on the Christian Albums chart, No. 2 on the Gospel Albums chart, No. 8 on the Independent Albums chart, No. 9 on the Rap Albums chart, No. 11 on the Digital Albums chart, and No. 63 on the Billboard 200.

References 

2011 albums
Tedashii albums
Reach Records albums
Albums produced by Street Symphony
Albums produced by DJ Official